After Dark is a series of computer screensaver software introduced by Berkeley Systems in 1989 for the Apple Macintosh, and in 1991 for Microsoft Windows.

Following the original, additional editions included More After Dark, Before Dark, and editions themed around licensed properties such as Star Trek, The Simpsons, Looney Tunes, Marvel, and Disney characters.

On top of the included animated screensavers, the program allowed for the development and use of third-party modules, many hundreds of which were created at the height of its popularity.

Flying Toasters

The most famous of the included screensaver modules is the iconic Flying Toasters, which featured 1940s-style chrome toasters sporting bird-like wings, flying across the screen with pieces of toast. Engineer Jack Eastman came up with the display after seeing a toaster in the kitchen during a late-night programming session and imagining the addition of wings. A slider in the Flying Toasters module enabled users to adjust the toast's darkness and an updated Flying Toasters Pro module added a choice of music—Richard Wagner's Ride of the Valkyries or a flying toaster anthem with optional karaoke lyrics.  Yet another version called Flying Toasters! added bagels and pastries, baby toasters, and more elaborate toaster animation. The Flying Toasters were one of the key reasons that After Dark became popular, and Berkeley began to produce other merchandising products such as T-shirts with the Flying Toaster image and slogans such as "The 51st Flying Toaster Squadron: On a mission to save your screen!"

The toasters were the subject of two lawsuits, the first in 1993, Berkeley Systems vs Delrina Corporation, over a module of Delrina's Opus 'N Bill screensaver in which Opus the penguin shoots down the toasters. After a U.S. District judge ruled that Delrina's "Death Toasters" was infringing, Delrina later changed the wings of the toasters to propellers. The second case was brought in 1994 by 1960s rock group Jefferson Airplane who claimed that the toasters were a copy of the winged toasters featured on the cover of their 1973 album Thirty Seconds Over Winterland. The case was dismissed because the cover art had not been registered as a trademark by the group prior to Berkeley Systems' release of the screensaver.

A 3D version of the toasters featuring swarms of toasters with airplane wings, rather than bird wings, is available for XScreenSaver.

History
In 1997, Berkeley Systems was acquired by the Sierra On-Line division of CUC International. Joan Blades and Wes Boyd, the founders of Berkeley Systems, went on to create MoveOn.org. Ed Fries, co-developer of the popular Fish! screensaver, became vice president of game publishing at Microsoft.

The Bad Dog (TV series) based on the "Bad Dog" screensaver was produced by CinéGroupe and Saban Entertainment for the Teletoon and Fox Family Channel networks that first aired on Teletoon on March 1, 1999.

An official version of After Dark was released for Mac OS X running on PowerPC by Infinisys, Ltd. of Japan in May 2003. 
For Apple M1 and Intel Macs, remakes of three popular modules — Flying Toasters, Mowing Man and Boris — are being sold as standalone screensavers.

Sierra released a Flying Toaster video game for cell phones in 2006.

Sierra Entertainment was eventually acquired by Vivendi Games, which in turn was merged with Activision to form Activision Blizzard. The After Dark franchise will be owned by Microsoft pending international approval of their acquisition of Activision Blizzard.

After Dark Games
Sierra Interactive and Berkeley Systems released After Dark Games in 1998 for the Macintosh and Windows platforms, which contained several games modeled after their previously released screensavers. These games included Mowin' Maniac (a Pac-Man clone based on the Mowin' Man and Mowin' Boris modules); Roof Rats (similar to SameGame and variants); Solitaire (After Dark themed); Toaster Run (an isometric Glider clone featuring several After Dark characters, including a Flying Toaster and Super Guy); Zapper (a trivia game); Hula Girl (an endless 2D platforming game based on the Hula Twins module from After Dark 4.0); two word scramble games — Bad Dog 911 (based on the Bad Dog modules) and Fish Shtix (based on the Fish modules, mainly Fish World); Foggy Boxes (a Dots and Boxes game based on the Messages 4.0 module); MooShu Tiles (a Mahjong-like game featuring many After Dark characters throughout the years); and Rodger Dodger (a Raimais clone that originated as a in-module game).

J.C. Herz of The New York Times wrote that the "sheer simplicity" of these games helped make them as "engaging and addictive as the mega-selling 40-hour sagas with souped-up 3-D sound and state-of-the-art computer graphics." A review in Computer Gaming World stated that, "If nothing else, it makes for a good time-killer."

Modules
{| class="wikitable"
|-
! scope="col" style="background:#efefef;" | Module Name
! scope="col" style="background:#efefef;" | Description
|-
| Starry Night
| The original After Dark screen saver, featuring a pixelated city skyline under a night sky
|-
| Artist
| A digital artist applies artistic touches to images in a slow manner so one can see the artist's work
|-
| Bad Dog
| Popular module featuring a white dog with a black ring around one of his eyes, causing trouble on the desktop (the animated series Bad Dog was inspired by the eponymous screensaver)
|-
| Bad Dog!
| A sequel to Bad Dog with new animations and sequences
|-
| Bogglins
| Green slime creatures are formed and make obnoxious noises
|-
| Boris
| The opposite of Bad Dog, a good cat plays on the desktop and chases butterflies
|-
| Bouncing Ball
| A ball bounces around the screen, including bouncing off the edges
|-
| Bugs
| Digital bugs crawl across the screen
|-
| Bulge
| Expands portions of the screen, making the screen appear to have a "bulge"
|-
| Bungee Roulette
| Various characters bungee-jump from the top of the screen, but occasionally the bungee cord breaks
|-
| Can of Worms
| "Worms" emerge from the screen, crawl around, and "eat" the screen content
|-
| Chameleon
| Chameleons walk across the screen, changing colors and eating icons
|-
| Clocks
| Different objects appear as a clock and move around
|-
| Coming Soon!
| A salesperson pitches fictitious "products"
|-
| Confetti Factory
| Confetti falls from the top of the screen and onto conveyor belts below
|-
| Daredevil Dan
| A daredevil motorcyclist attempts dangerous jumps over school buses, flames, and piranha tanks
|-
| Dominoes
| A game of dominoes is played on the screen
|-
| Doodles
| Draws doodle-like images
|-
| DOS Shell
| A mock DOS shell is run on the screen, reliving earlier days of computing
|-
| Dots
| A game of "dots" is played on the screen
|-
| Down the Drain
| The desktop appears to spiral down a drain
|-
| Einstein
| Complex mathematical and scientific equations are performed on the screen
|-
| Fade Away
| The desktop fades away in different ways
|-
| Fish! (Aquatic Realm)
| Underwater world of fish with a black background
|-
| Fish Pro
| An updated version of Fish!
|-
| Fish World
| The third iteration of Fish! with prerendered 3D models
|-
| Floating Suns
| Displays the Phoenix Suns basketball team's logos floating around the screen
|-
| Flocks
| Displays flocks of various creatures on the screen
|-
| Flying Toasters
| Classic module featuring flying toasters
|-
| Flying Toasters Pro
| Updated version that allows one to select more than flying toasters and also has music
|-
| Flying Toasters!
| 4.0 iteration of the flying toasters with updated graphics and music — introduces baby toasters
|-
| Flying Toilets
| Parody of Flying Toasters with toilets replacing the toasters
|-
| Fractal Forest
| A forest of trees is generated on the screen
|-
| FrankenScreen
| A digital Frankenstein creates creatures out of various parts
|-
| Frost and Fire
| Produces patterns similar to splattering paint on paper
|-
| GeoBounce
| A geometrical figure bounces around the screen
|-
| Globe
| Takes an image and wraps it around a sphere, then spins like a globe
|-
| GraphStat
| Draws scientific and mathematical graphs on the screen
|-
| Gravity
| Circles bounce around the screen
|-
| Guts
| Gravity simulation
|-
| Hall of Fame
| 10th-anniversary module featuring anime-style recreations of various After Dark characters
|-
| Hall of Mirrors
| Reflects parts of the screen in an infinite mirror style
|-
| Hallucinations
| The computer "hallucinates"
|-
| Hard Rain
| Rain falls onto the desktop
|-
| Hula Twins
| Displays two animated figures who walk around and twirl hula hoops
|-
| Lasers
| Lasers create patterns on the screen
|-
| Lissajous
| Displays Lissajous designs
|-
| Logo
| User-supplied image moves randomly on the screen
|-
| Lunatic Fringe
| A playable space shooter game within a module
|-
| Magic
| Creates soothing patterns
|-
| Mandelbrot
| Generates a mathematically created Mandelbrot set
|-
| Marbles
| Marbles bounce around the screen
|-
| Meadow
| A computer-generated meadow
|-
| Message Mayhem
| A figure on the screen scrawls out a message
|-
| Messages
| Displays a crawling marquee message on the screen with selectable font and text colors
|-
| Mike's So-called Life
| Features a man named Mike, living in his apartment and doing nothing exciting
|-
| Mime Hunt
| A playable module that features a mime and cross-hairs
|-
| Modern Art
| Modern Art displayed on the screen
|-
| Mondrian
| Inverts parts of the screen
|-
| Mosaic
| Creates a mosaic of the screen
|-
| Mountains
| Generates 3-D mountains
|-
| Movies 'Til Dawn
| Plays QuickTime movies
|-
| Mowin' Boris
| Mowin' Man mows a field with Boris the cat around. When Mowin' Man runs over Boris, blood and guts, appear
|-
| Mowin' Man
| A man mows a constantly growing field
|-
| MultiModule
| Displays a user-selected combination of After Dark modules with the modules all displayed simultaneously and optionally overlaid over each other
|-
| NightLines
| 
|-
| Nirvana
| Generates colorful textures
|-
| Nocturnes
| Shows the eyes of various nocturnal creatures, such as bats
|-
| Nonsense
| Nonsensical phrases are displayed on the screen
|-
| Om Appliances
| Various appliances do weird things on the screen
|-
| Origami
| Computer-generated origami appears on the screen
|-
| Out and About
| A musician walks out with a chair and an instrument, sits down and begins to play while other people slowly appear and begin milling around while kids play
|-
| Pattern
| Animated patterns appear on the screen
|-
| Pearl
| An optical effect featuring squares
|-
| Penrose
| Penrose tiling effect
|-
| Phlegm Boy
| An obnoxious slimy creature is disgusting and displays bad habits
|-
| Photon
| Computer-generated particles of light are emitted from the darkness
|-
| PICS Player
| Plays an animated sequence from a PICS file on the Mac platform
|-
| Plasma
| Plasma-like image generated
|-
| Punch Out
| Round holes appear to be punched out of the desktop
|-
| Puzzle
| The desktop becomes a sliding puzzle
|-
| Rain
| Colorful raindrops fall on the desktop
|-
| Rainstorm
| Like the Rain module, but with wind and lightning
|-
| Rainy Day
| Rain drops on the screen. Users can select how fast they fall and how strong the wind is.
|-
| Randomizer
| Randomly displays modules chosen from a user-generated list of modules
|-
| Rat Race
| A race featuring three rats with names, mindlessly wandering around the track until there is a winner
|-
| Rebound
| Balls rebound around the screen
|-
| Rose
| Mathematical pattern based on trigonometry
|-
| Satori
| Color animated light show
|-
| Say What?
| Displays humorous phrases
|-
| Scrubbing Bubbles
| Displays multiple Scrubbing Bubbles (Dow Brands) floating around the screen
|-
| Scrubbing Bubbles II
| Displays multiple Scrubbing Bubbles (Dow Brands) "scrubbing" the screen and going down the drain
|-
| Shapes
| Fills the screen with colorful, geometric shapes
|-
| Shock Clocks
| Scary creatures are turned into clocks
|-
| Shooting Spree
| The desktop appears to be shot up by a gun. Users can select which gun to use.
|-
| Sinkhole
| The desktop appears to fall into sinkholes
|-
| Slide Show
| A basic slide show of user-supplied images
|-
| Snake
| A pixelated snake tries to find its way through a maze
|-
| Spheres
| A number of spheres fill the screen
|-
| Spin Brush
| Smears points on the screen like wet paper
|-
| Spiral Gyro
| Vector module that twists lines
|-
| Spotlight
| The desktop becomes black, and parts are "illuminated" by a randomly moving light spot
|-
| Squigwig
| Generates mathematical circles
|-
| Stained Glass
| Produces quilt-like patterns
|-
| Steam Rollin'
| Displays a guy driving around squishing toys, snakes and babies (a take-off on the Mowin' Man module)
|-
| Stormy Night
| Random lightning bolts with thunderclap sounds
|-
| Strange Attractor
| Computer-generated color image
|-
| String Theory
| Moire patterns
|-
| Sunburst
| Color pattern that appears to come from the Sun
|-
| Supernova
| Displays an exploding supernova
|-
| Swan Lake
| Swans swim around the desktop
|-
| This Ol' House
| Someone appears to be working on the desktop from the other side with power saws
|-
| Toaster 2K
| 10th anniversary module featuring futuristic and mecha versions of the flying toasters
|-
| Toxic Swamp
| Parody of Fish!, but in a toxic, polluted swamp with mutated fish and a mob boss
|-
| Tunnel
| Makes the screen appear to be a tunnel
|-
| Use Your Own!
| Displays multiple images of the users choice moving around the screen
|-
| Vertigo
| Colorful rainbow spirals drawn on the screen
|-
| Virex-D
| An implementation of the Virex anti-virus utility. Scans for viruses and displays icons in 3D form 
|-
| Voyeur
| One appears to be spying on an apartment complex with a big city skyline in the background
|-
| Warp
| One appears to be travelling among stars at high speed
|-
| Window Blinds
| Desktop is separated into columns, and then each one turns like a window blind
|-
| Wrap Around
| Draws three-dimensional loops
|-
| Wrecking Ball
| A wrecking ball appears to demolish the desktop
|-
| You Bet Your Head
| Playable quiz game featuring three colored "heads" that are smashed by a hammer if one supplies the wrong answer to a question
|-
| Zoom!
| Creates colorful triangular tubes
|-
| Zot
| Attempts to generate lightning
|}

Release history
version 1.0 - 1989
version 2.0 - 1992 - The first official release for Windows.
version 3.0 - 1994
version 3.2 - 1995
version 4.0 - 1996

Licensed Products
Star Trek: The Screen Saver - 1992
The Disney Collection Screen Saver - 1993
Marvel Comics Screen Posters - 1993
X-Men Screen Saver - 1994
The Simpsons Screen Saver - 1994
Star Trek: The Next Generation Screen Saver - 1994
Looney Tunes Screen Saver - 1995
Toy Story - 1995
Myst Screen Saver
Chex Quest Screen Saver - 1997 (unlicensed module built on the After Dark software)

References

Further reading

External links
 After Dark X — the official version for Mac OS X by Infinisys
 Aggressively Stupid: The Story Behind After Dark, By Tommy Thomas - 2007.02.09
 On Mighty Toaster Wings: More After Dark History, By Tommy Thomas - 2007.02.12
 How After Dark Came to Windows

Screensavers
Discontinued software
Display technology
Classic Mac OS software
Utilities for macOS
Utilities for Windows
Computer-related introductions in 1989
Sierra Entertainment
1990s fads and trends